Centreville Historic District is a national historic district at Centreville, Queen Anne's County, Maryland, United States. It contains an exceptional collection of 18th, 19th, and 20th century buildings chronicling the architectural development of an Eastern Shore of Maryland community. Among Centreville's residential, commercial, and ecclesiastical buildings are representative examples of the various architectural types and styles which characterized towns in the region during the period.

It was added to the National Register of Historic Places in 2004.

References

External links
, including photo from 2003, at Maryland Historical Trust
Boundary Map of the Centreville Historic District, Queen Anne's County, at Maryland Historical Trust

Historic districts in Queen Anne's County, Maryland
Federal architecture in Maryland
Greek Revival architecture in Maryland
Historic districts on the National Register of Historic Places in Maryland
National Register of Historic Places in Queen Anne's County, Maryland